Miriam Rossi is an Italian-American chemist and the Mary Landon Sague Chair at Vassar College. She works on x-ray crystallography and chemistry education.

Early life and education 
Rossi was born Italy and moved to New York City as a child. She studied chemistry at Hunter College, where she worked with David Beveridge. She joined Johns Hopkins University for her doctoral studies, earning a PhD in inorganic chemistry under the supervision of Tom Kistenmacher. She worked on the refinement of 1-methylcytosine.

Research and career 

Rossi joined the Fox Chase Cancer Center as a postdoctoral fellow with Jenny Glusker. Here she determined the structure of methylcobalamin, an active compound of Vitamin B12.

In 1982 Rossi joined Vassar College. She uses X-ray crystallography to study the structure and function of molecules, particularly those with biological activity. In the early '90s Rossi drove a U-Haul containing a single crystal X-ray diffractometer from Philadelphia to Vassar College. It was the first undergraduate United States college to own a  diffractometer. She has investigated several biological molecules, including quercetin, curcumin and resveratrol. Rossi identified the bioactivity of curcumin. At Vassar College, Rossi supervised Cathy Drennan, and has continued to act as her mentor. She serves on the US National Committee for Crystallography and International Union of Crystallography Commission on Education.

Rossi has been involved with teaching crystallography and chemistry throughout her academic career. She is responsible for teaching structural chemistry and biochemistry. At Vassar she led the Culture and Chemistry of Cuisine course. In the class, students learn about fermentation, leavening and the behaviour of starches. She has worked with The Culinary Institute of America on their culinary science program. After being asked to speak about the nutritional benefits of the Mediterranean diet, Rossi became interested in the scientific origins. She collaborated with an olive oil producer in California and found that olive oil limited the growth of tumour cells and had strong antioxidant properties. Working with undergraduate students from Vassar College, Rossi investigated the health improving properties of goji berries; using X-ray diffraction to determine the structure of β-ionone, emodin and cnidium. She also looked at hispolon, a compound that is found in mushrooms from East Asia. She was made the Mary Landon Sague Professor of Chemistry in 2008.

Rossi worked on initiatives to advance women faculty memberships into leadership positions. She has developed mentoring schemes and cyber networking opportunities. She looked at horizontal peer mentoring for senior women at liberal arts colleges.  In 2017 Rossi was named at the Diamond Level of the Mid-Hudson section of the American Chemical Society.

Publications

References

American crystallographers
American people of Italian descent
Vassar College faculty
Hunter College alumni
Johns Hopkins University alumni